is a Japanese professional wrestler, currently working for the Japanese promotion World Wonder Ring Stardom where she is a former two-time Goddess of Stardom Champion with Hazuki and a former High Speed Champion.

Professional wrestling career

Independent circuit (2015-present)
Koguma is known for making brief appearances outside of Stardom. She worked in a couple of matches for Sendai Girls' Pro Wrestling, one of them taking place on April 18, 2014 at a house show of the promotion where she teamed up with Nanae Takahashi in a losing effort to Meiko Satomura and Sareee.

World Wonder Ring Stardom

(2013-2015)

Koguma made her professional wrestling debut on the November 4, 2013 event of Stardom Season 14 Goddesses In Stars where she unsuccessfully challenged Natsuki Taiyo in a singles match. She continued to make sporadic appearances until her first notable victory at Stardom Takumi Iroha Triumphant Return from March 30, 2014, where she won a 14-person battle royal also involving Act Yasukawa, Alpha Female, Nanae Takahashi, and others. 
At the 2014 edition of Goddesses of Stardom Tag League, Koguma teamed up with Miho Wakizawa, placing themselves in the Blue Block where they scored a total of two points after going against Hatsuhinode Kamen & Kaori Yoneyama, Io Shirai & Mayu Iwatani, and Mystique & Star Fire.

Koguma dropped the High Speed Championship to Star Fire at Stardom Gold 2015 from May 17, confrontation which represented her last match before her temporary retirement from professional wrestling.

(2021-present)
Koguma returned to professional wrestling after a six-year hiatus at the 10th Anniversary of Stardom on March 3, 2021, where she participated in a 24-women Stardom All-Star rumble match also involving superstars from the promotion's past such as Chigusa Nagayo, Kyoko Inoue, Yuzuki Aikawa, Bea Priestley and others. On the second night of the Stardom Cinderella Tournament 2021 from May 14, Koguma made her official in-ring return, saving Mayu Iwatani from an attack performed by Oedo Tai after the latter fell short to Himeka in the quarter-finals of the tournament. She was later revealed to have joined the Stars stable. On the third night of the tournament from June 12, Koguma teamed up with fellow stablemates Mayu Iwatani, Starlight Kid, Hanan and Rin Kadokura, losing to Oedo Tai's (Natsuko Tora, Konami, Fukigen Death, Ruaka and Saki Kashima) in a Ten-woman elimination tag team match where Starlight Kid was eliminated last and she was forced to join Oedo Tai. At Yokohama Dream Cinderella 2021 in Summer on July 4, she teamed up with fellow Stars stablemate Mayu Iwatani and unsuccessfully challenged Alto Livello Kabaliwan (Giulia and Syuri) for the Goddess of Stardom Championship. At the Stardom 5 Star Grand Prix 2021, Koguma fought in the "Red Stars" block, scoring a total of 11 points after competing against Momo Watanabe, Mayu Iwatani, Starlight Kid, Himeka, Fukigen Death, Natsupoi, Giulia, Mina Shirakawa and Saki Kashima. At Stardom 10th Anniversary Grand Final Osaka Dream Cinderella on October 9, 2021, Koguma fell short to Hazuki in a singles match. At Kawasaki Super Wars, the first event of the Stardom Super Wars trilogy which took place on November 3, 2021, Koguma teamed up with Mayu Iwatani and went into a time-limit draw against Donna Del Mondo's Himeka and Natsupoi. At Tokyo Super Wars on November 27, she unsuccessfully challenged Starlight Kid for the High Speed Championship. At Osaka Super Wars, the last event of the series from December 18, Koguma teamed up with Hazuki and Mayu Iwatani and took part in a ¥10 Million Unit Tournament which was also contested for the Artist of Stardom Championship by first defeating Cosmic Angels (Tam Nakano, Mina Shirakawa and Unagi Sayaka) in the semi finals, and eventually falling short to the championsMaiHimePoi (Maika, Natsupoi and Himeka) in the finals on the same night as a result of a Six-woman tag team ladder match. At Stardom Dream Queendom on December 29, 2021, Koguma challenged Starlight Kid again for the High Speed Championship unsuccessfully, this time in a three-way match also involving AZM.

At Stardom in Korakuen Hall on January 9, 2022, Koguma and Hazuki defeated Alto Livello Kabaliwan (Giulia and Syuri) to win the Goddess of Stardom Championship. At Stardom Nagoya Supreme Fight on January 29, 2022, they scored their first successful defense against MaiHime (Maika and Himeka). At Stardom Cinderella Journey on February 23, 2022, they defeated Cosmic Angels (Mina Shirakawa and Unagi Sayaka) to retain the titles again. On the first night of the Stardom World Climax 2022 from March 26, Hazuki and Koguma dropped the titles to Black Desire (Starlight Kid and Momo Watanabe). On the second night from March 27, Koguma competed in a three-way match for the High Speed Championship against the champion AZM and Natsupoi. At the Stardom Cinderella Tournament 2022, Koguma fell short to Mirai in the finals from April 29. At Stardom Golden Week Fight Tour in May 5, 2022, Hazuki and Koguma regained the Goddess of Stardom Championship from Starlight Kid and Momo Watanabe. At Stardom Flashing Champions on May 28, 2022, they defended the titles against Giulia and Mai Sakurai. At Stardom Fight in the Top on June 26, 2022, Koguma teamed up with Mayu Iwatani and Hazuki to defeat (Utami Hayashishita, AZM and Saya Kamitani) in a six-woman tag team steel cage match. At Mid Summer Champions in Tokyo, the first event of the Stardom Mid Summer Champions which took place on July 9, 2022, Koguma teamed up with Mayu Iwatani, Hazuki and Saya Iida in a losing effort against Oedo Tai (Saki Kashima, Ruaka, Rina and Fukigen Death). At Mid Summer Champions in Nagoya on July 24, Hazuki and Koguma defended the Goddess of Stardom Championship against God's Eye (Ami Sourei and Mirai). At Stardom in Showcase vol.1 on July 23, 2022, Koguma participated in a Four-way falls count anywhere match against AZM, Tam Nakano and Momo Watanabe. At Stardom 5 Star Grand Prix 2022, Koguma fought in the "Red Goddess" block where she scored a total of 14 points after competing against Tam Nakano, Maika, Himeka, Risa Sera, AZM, Utami Hayashishita, Syuri, Saki Kashima, Mai Sakurai, Saki, Momo Kohgo and Unagi Sayaka. At Stardom x Stardom: Nagoya Midsummer Encounter on August 21, 2022, Koguma and Hazuki dropped the Goddess of Stardom Championship to Tam Nakano and Natsupoi.

Championships and accomplishments
Pro Wrestling Illustrated
 Ranked No. 5 of the top 100 tag team in the PWI Tag Team 100 in 2022 
 Ranked No. 91 of the top 150 female wrestlers in the PWI Women's 150 in 2022
World Wonder Ring Stardom
Artist of Stardom Championship (1 time) – with Chelsea and Kairi Hojo
Goddess of Stardom Championship (2 times) – with Hazuki
Goddesses of Stardom Tag League (2021) – with Hazuki
High Speed Championship (1 time)
Stardom Year-End Award (3 times)
Best Tag Team Award (2021) 
Best Unit Award (2022) 
Fighting Spirit Award (2014)

References

1998 births
Living people
People from Tagawa, Fukuoka
Japanese female professional wrestlers
Sportspeople from Fukuoka Prefecture
Goddess of Stardom Champions
Artist of Stardom Champions
21st-century professional wrestlers
High Speed Champions